Rita Kassabian is an Armenian composer in Lebanon.

She was fascinated by the piano from an early age: from 1996 till 1997, she followed the advice of her mentor and internationally known late pianist Walid Akl who encouraged her to excel in music.  She studied piano, harmony, and analysis, then was admitted to Schola Cantorum de Paris (France) in the composition/orchestration class of Patrice Sciortino in September 2001.

A maember of the French Société des auteurs, compositeurs et éditeurs de musique, she is also the chairwoman of the music associations ARKOncerts and A.R.K., which promote young talent.

Awards ( Paris )

2004
 Second prize in orchestration with honour

2005
 first prize in orchestration with honour
 prize of composition in chamber music with honour

2006
 prize of composition in solo instrument with honour

2007
 first prize in composition for chamber music
 first prize in composition for solo instrument
 first prize of composition for chorus
 first prize of composition for symphonic music

Compositions 
 April 2005 
Impromptu for 2 flutes, cello, 4 timpani and 1 harp (composition prize 2005)

 December 2005 
Divertimento for solo tenor saxophone, edited by L'Harmattan Editions - Paris (composition prize 2006)

 January 2006 
Waltz for flute and strings

 January 2006
Evasions for solo contrabass

 May 2007
Trio for flute, tenor saxophone, and cello

 October 2008
Suite for strings (La Madeleine church Paris)

 October 2008
Concerto for flute, string orchestra, french horn, harp, timpani, and percussion (La Madeleine, Paris)
 March 2009
Fantasia for flute ensemble (Saint Germain des Prés Auditorium, Paris)

 December 2009
Concerto for tenor saxophone, oboe, strings, and percussion (Paris)

 May 2010
Concerto for tenor saxophone, saxophone band, and percussion (new version of the concerto created in December 2009 (Paris)

External links

Armenian composers
Lebanese people of Armenian descent
Lebanese composers
Living people
Schola Cantorum de Paris alumni
Women composers
Year of birth missing (living people)